Veys Morid (also Romanized as Veys Morīd and Veis Morid; also known as Vāzmīreh, Veys Morī, and Wāzmīri) is a village in Howmeh Rural District, in the Central District of Bijar County, Kurdistan Province, Iran. At the 2006 census, its population was 60, in 12 families. The village is populated by Kurds.

References 

Towns and villages in Bijar County
Kurdish settlements in Kurdistan Province